Jennifer Lyon is an American actress. She is best known for her roles as Jennifer Husser on the TNT series Claws (2017), Mackenzie Bradford-Lopez on the FX sitcom Saint George (2014), and Lindsey Salazar on the FX drama Justified (2010).

Early life and education
Lyon is a native of High Point, North Carolina. She is the daughter of Reverend Ken Lyon, a former pastor of the First United Methodist Church. She moved around the state a few times growing up for her father's work. She attended Ferndale Middle School and High Point Central High School. She went on to study at the University of North Carolina School of the Arts, graduating in 2003.

Career
Upon graduation, Lyon moved to New York where she worked in theatre and formed her own comedy sketch troupe POYKPAC. Her work with POYKPAC, led to her co-starring in the IFC web comedy television series Good Morning, Internet!. In 2011, she guest starred in Army Wives and Louie, before being cast in a recurring role as Lindsey Salazar in the FX series Justified, appearing in the series from 2012–2013. In 2013, she was cast as Mackenzie Bradford-Lopez in the FX sitcom Saint George, starring George Lopez, playing the ex-wife of Lopez's character.

Personal life
Lyon married her long-term partner Taige Jensen at the Astoria World Manor in Queens in October 2019. The ceremony was officiated by her father. The pair had met 13 years earlier at a sketch comedy show in Brooklyn.

Lyon has opened up about her experiences with disordered eating and receiving treatment from the Renfrew Center. She considers herself a feminist and has vocally supported reproductive rights, body positivity, and other movements.

Filmography

References

External links

Living people
21st-century American actresses
Actresses from North Carolina
American film actresses
American stage actresses
American television actresses
People from High Point, North Carolina
University of North Carolina School of the Arts alumni
Year of birth missing (living people)